Humphrey Willyams (1792 – 7 May 1872) was a British Whig politician.

Willyams was elected a Whig Member of Parliament for Truro at a by-election in 1849—caused by the death of Edmund Turner—and held the seat until 1852 when he did not seek re-election.

References

External links
 

UK MPs 1847–1852
Whig (British political party) MPs for English constituencies
1792 births
1872 deaths
Members of the Parliament of the United Kingdom for Truro